Richard Eliason (born 8 April 1988) is an Australian swimmer. He was selected to represent Australia at the 2012 Summer Paralympics in swimming. He has an intellectual disability and was among the first intellectually disabled athletes to compete in the Paralympics after the 2000 Summer Paralympics intellectual disability controversy. While he did not receive a medal at the Games, he placed 5th in the final. He is a recipient of the Service to Australian Swim Team award.

Personal
Eliason was born on 8 April 1988 with an intellectual disability and is from Flynn, Australian Capital Territory. In December 2011 during his preparation for the national selection trials for the 2012 Summer Paralympics, Eliason was injured in a motorbike accident, breaking his spine in five places, preventing him from training for two months. Some of his Games preparation took place at the Canberra International Sports & Aquatic Centre. Given his motorbike accident, his coaches advised him to take the bus from place to place and to avoid using his bike until after the Paralympics.

Swimming
Eliason is an SB14 classified swimmer, and is coached by Cameron Gledhill at his club venue Canberra International Sports & Aquatic Centre. , he had a swimming scholarship with the Australian Capital Territory Academy of Sport. He started competitive swimming in 2001. At the Brisbane hosted 2006 Australian national titles, he placed in the top three in the 400 metres freestyle multi-disability event. In March 2012, he competed in the Adelaide hosted national selection trials, where he won the men's 100 metres breaststroke with a time of 1:10.07.

Eliason made his national team debut at the 2005 INAS-FID Global Games, where he won a silver medal in the 200 metre breaststroke event. He won a pair of gold medals, four silver medals and a bronze medal 2007 INAS-FID Global Games. He competed in the Global Games again in 2009, where he earned a pair of gold and silver medals, and three bronze medals. He was a member of the Australian team competing at the Dutch hosted 2011 IPC World Swimming Championships. in 2012 he posted the fastest time in the world in his classification in the 100 meters butterfly.

Paralympics

In July 2012, Eliason was formally selected to represent Australia at the 2012 Summer Paralympics in the men's 100 metres breaststroke event in the intellectual disability classification, which had been excluded since the 2000 Summer Paralympics intellectual disability controversy. He placed 5th in the final. He did not gain a medal at the 2012 Games.

Personal bests

Awards 
In 2017, Eliason was awarded the Service to Australian Swim Team award.

References

Male Paralympic swimmers of Australia
Swimmers at the 2012 Summer Paralympics
1988 births
Living people
S14-classified Paralympic swimmers
Australian male medley swimmers
Australian male breaststroke swimmers
20th-century Australian people
21st-century Australian people